Robert Earl Bonney (November 23, 1882 – November 22, 1967) was a United States Navy sailor and a recipient of the United States military's highest decoration, the Medal of Honor.

Biography

Early life and career
Bonney was born in Maryville, Blount County, Tennessee on November 23, 1882.

In 1901, at the age of 18, he joined the Navy in Leavenworth, Kansas. His early career included service in the Philippines during the Philippine Insurrection.

Medal of Honor action
On that day, the Hopkins experienced a boiler accident. For their actions during the incident, Bonney and another sailor, Watertender Edward Alvin Clary, were awarded the Medal of Honor.

Bonney's official Medal of Honor citation reads:
While serving on board the U.S.S. Hopkins, Bonney displayed extraordinary heroism in the line of his profession on the occasion of the accident to one of the boilers of that vessel, 14 February 1910.

Later career
Bonney's later career included service in Nicaragua in 1912, the Mexican intervention in 1914 and World War I.  He retired from the Navy in 1930 the warrant officer rank of chief machinist. 

Bonney returned to active duty during World War II and was promoted to lieutenant.  He served as an inspector of shipyards in Seattle, Washington.  He retired from the Navy for the second time shortly after the war's end in 1945.

Retirement
Bonney was an active in Freemasonry, the American Legion and the Fleet Reserve Association.

In 1957 he was invited to attend the second inauguration of President Dwight Eisenhower.  In 1958, at Eisenhower's request, he laid a wreath at the Tomb of the Unknowns at Arlington National Cemetery.  He also attended the funeral of President John F. Kennedy at the invitation of the Kennedy family. 

He died on November 22, 1967, one day before his 85th birthday, and was buried at Acacia Memorial Park near Seattle, Washington.

Awards
Medal of Honor
Philippine Campaign Medal
Nicaraguan Campaign Medal
Mexican Service Medal
World War I Victory Medal
American Campaign Medal
World War II Victory Medal

See also

List of Medal of Honor recipients

References

1882 births
1967 deaths
People from Tennessee
United States Navy sailors
United States Navy Medal of Honor recipients
Non-combat recipients of the Medal of Honor